Anders Lindsjö (born 29 August 1969) is a Swedish weightlifter. He competed in the men's heavyweight II event at the 1992 Summer Olympics.

References

1969 births
Living people
Swedish male weightlifters
Olympic weightlifters of Sweden
Weightlifters at the 1992 Summer Olympics
Sportspeople from Helsingborg
20th-century Swedish people